Monster Hunter: Legends of the Guild is an American CG animated fantasy film by Steve Yamamoto in his directorial debut. It is based on the Japanese video game franchise Monster Hunter by Capcom. The film premiered on August 12, 2021, on Netflix.

Plot 
Before Monster Hunter: World, as the Fifth Fleet makes its way across the Great Sea to the New World, a group of young hunters aboard the flagship begin to brag about the upcoming battle against the Elder Dragon, Zorah Magdaros, only to be silenced by Aiden, a veteran hunter sitting nearby. Hoping to humble the youngsters, Aiden recounts his own tale of his first encounter with an Elder Dragon.

Ten years ago, Aiden was a teenager living in a small mountain village. Since the village is so small and remote, the people cannot afford the time or zenny (the in-world currency) required to go to the nearest Guild-house whenever some minor monster makes a pest of itself. Aiden had taken it upon himself to hunt down these monsters for his neighbors. He is sent into the wild to find the monster that stole some livestock from the village, only to encounter a Velocidrome, a large, blue, Velociraptor-like Bird Wyvern. Aiden is almost eaten by the monster until Julius, a Hunter from the guild, saves him and escorts him back to the village. Soon Aiden learns from Julius that the monster that took the livestock, an anthropomorphic catlike Lynian creature called a Melynx, was the true culprit and the tracks Aiden was following were fake. Aiden finds the hideout of the Melynx, named Nox. Aiden captures Nox and brings him to the village to show Julius. He soon learns from the Wyverian leader that an Elder Dragon, a monster that can devastate the environment and leave mass destruction in its wake, is on its migration path to the New World, which will bring it through Aiden's village.

Julius agrees to bring Aiden to see the Elder Dragon to confirm the upcoming attack so that the villagers will agree to evacuate. Aiden, Julius, and Nox reach the site where the Elder Dragon was sighted. The Elder Dragon is revealed to be a Lunastra, a blue female Manticore-like Elder Dragon with powers to cause explosions with her powder. Aiden decides to have the whole village fight off the Lunastra instead of fleeing from it. Though it's against his protocol, Julius decides to stay with the village and fight off the Lunastra as well, shooting a signal flare to call other Hunters.

Later, the trio meet up with two Hunters named Mae, the owner of a journal Nox stole, and Nadia, a Bowgunner and an old partner of Julius. They were both hunting a Nerscylla, a large, spider-like Temnoceran Monster with poisonous crystals on its back. They kill the Nerscylla and agree to help with the fight against the Lunastra. Information from a trapped villager leads them to the blacksmith Ravi, a retired Hunter who does not take kindly to strangers. He refuses to help the party, saying that there is no light at the end of the tunnel if they fight the Elder Dragon.

They return to Aiden's village, letting everyone in on the plan to drive off the Lunastra. During the preparations, the team attempts to hunt a Congalala, a large pink, hippo-headed primate-like Fanged Beast that consumes different mushrooms to power its breath and flatulence attacks. However, the hunt is interrupted by a Deviljho, a savage Tyrannosaurid-like Brute Wyvern with dangerous Dragon Element breath. They manage to defeat both monsters, but Julius scolds Aiden for his arrogance in failing to secure their trap for the Deviljho. Later, in the village, Nadia tells Julius to go easy on Aiden because just like him, Julius made mistakes when trying to impress his master in the past. Ravi meets up with the team, revealing he has changed his mind and decided to help fight the Elder Dragon. Ravi, with the help of many other smiths, craft a super weapon called a Dragonator using parts from the Congalala and Deviljho. Once the preparations are complete, the villagers feast and await the siege. During the fight, Ravi and Mae are killed by the Lunastra, but Aiden has an idea to use gunpowder to burst the village dam to flood the village while the rest of the team distract the Elder Dragon. The flood produced by the broken dam puts out the fire and repels the Lunastra from the village.

After dealing with Lunastra, Mae and Ravi are mourned. Aiden then decides to join Julius and Nadia as an "Ace Cadet" to the distant town of Dundorma to become one of the Guild Hunters. The film ends to the present day and sets up towards World.

Voice cast 
 Dante Basco as Aiden
 Erica Lindbeck as Lea
 Brando Eaton as Julius
 Karen Strassman as Genovan/Ebbi
 Stephen Kramer Glickman as Nox
 Brian Beacock as Navid
 Katie Leigh as Elder Daazeel
 G. K. Bowes as Nadia
 Jay Preston as Mitul
 Ben Rausch as Gibson
 Caroline Caliston as Mae
 Dan McCoy as Ravi

Production 
The film was first announced back in July 2018 as a "special" with its original video game developer/publisher Capcom, in joint collaboration with American company Pure Imagination Studios, handling its production. It was originally set for a release window in 2019. Joshua Fine serves as scriptwriter.

Release 
The film was released on August 12, 2021, on Netflix.

References

External links 
 
 

2020s American animated films
2021 computer-animated films
2021 directorial debut films
2021 films
2021 fantasy films
Monster Hunter
Animated films based on video games
Films based on Capcom video games
2020s English-language films